Trubchevsky Uyezd (Трубче́вский уе́зд) was one of the subdivisions of the Oryol Governorate of the Russian Empire. It was situated in the western part of the governorate. Its administrative centre was Trubchevsk.

Demographics
At the time of the Russian Empire Census of 1897, Trubchevsky Uyezd had a population of 130,455. Of these, 99.4% spoke Russian, 0.3% Yiddish and 0.2% Ukrainian as their native language.

References

 
Uezds of Oryol Governorate
Oryol Governorate